The Swakop River is a major river in western central Namibia. Its river source is in the Khomas Highland. From there it flows westwards through the town of Okahandja, the historic mission station at Gross Barmen, and the settlement of Otjimbingwe. It then crosses the Namib desert and reaches the Atlantic Ocean at Swakopmund. The Swakop is an ephemeral river; its run-off is roughly 40 million cubic metres per annum.

The Swakop River, along with its main tributary Khan, is one of the largest temporary water-bearing rivers in the dry western part of Namibia. The name comes from the Khoekhoe languages of the Nama and Damara .  means ‘excrement opening’ or ‘anus‘ while  stands for the ‘contents of excrement.’ This name derives from the observation that the flow of large amounts of brownish sludge in the rain with it and discharges into the Atlantic Ocean.

The area around the river mouth and the surrounding dunes are also known for rich bird life and some unusual plant species (like the Welwitschia) that use the regular fog drifting in from the sea to sustain themselves in the absence of other moisture.

Groundwater levels in the area have also dropped about 0.3 m further due to the presence of two big dams built on the Swakop River.

Notwithstanding the river’s irregular flow, some agriculture is undertaken in the Swakop River valley, thus the region is well known for its fresh produce, especially tomatoes, asparagus and olives. There are some fears of salt and uranium (possibly natural, possibly from the Rössing uranium mine) endangering this farming industry.

Hydrology
The Swakop drains a catchment area of 30,100 km² extending from the mouth into the Atlantic Ocean at Swakopmund over Otjimbingwe and in the east to about 50 km from Okahandja, and in the south to Khomas Highlands outside Windhoek. The highest point of the watershed is located at 2,480 m. Annual rainfall varies from 0 mm in the lower reaches up to 475 mm in the eastern Khomas Highlands. 39% of the catchment area experiences rainfall that exceeds 300 mm per year, and up to 80% of the catchment experiences annual rainfall above 100 mm.

The Von Bach Dam near Okahandja and Swakoppoort Dam west of Gross Barmen in the upper reaches of the Swakop are of great importance for the water supply of Central Namibia. Like all rivers, the Swakop also has a number of major sources and major wetlands in the lower reaches. Existing groundwater, however, is often salty due to soil salinity.

On the lower reaches of the river, flooding has become ever more increasing, due to increased land use of the Swakop gallery forests. This contributes to a stronger and more rapid runoff and increased erosion of the Swakop Marshlands.

Vegetation and fauna
Because of its size and scope, the Swakop has a very diverse catchment area. 29% of the area is in highveld savanna, 28% in thornveld savanna, 34% in semidesert and savanna transition zone, and 9% in the central Namib Desert. In the Highlands a more or less dense bush vegetation prevails. In the arid lower reaches there is a more limited flora on the Swakop River valley itself, with the typical gallery vegetation from ana trees (Faidherbia albida), tamarisk (Tamarix), camel thorn (Acacia erioloba), Salvadora, various fig species, Euclea and also tobacco (Nicotiana spp.), Jimsonweed (Datura) and mesquite (Prosopis spp.) as invasive species.

Wildlife in the Swakop is found practically only in sparsely populated lower reaches and is limited to antelope, smaller predators and birds. Big game such as elephants, rhinos, lions and other big cats are no longer to be found. In the rest of the catchment area, there are, however, a number of tourist and game farms, and the big cats are kept there.

Usage and colonisation

Unlike the rest of the dry rivers in western Namibia, there are large human settlements in the basin of the Swakop River, such as the towns of Usakos, Karibib, Otjimbingwe, Okahandja and Namibia's capital, Windhoek, so that the population in the catchment area is more than 200,000 persons.

While in the upper reaches of the river the farms are often far from the river and extensive grazing is operated, the dams and the high ground water level along the entire Swakop River Valley make intensive farming and even gardening, such as the cultivation of asparagus in Swakopmund Goanikontes, possible.

The extensive use of the groundwater in agriculture and the high water consumption in cities result in the lowering of the water table. This leads, particularly in the lower reaches, to the drying up of many springs as well as to the death of the gallery vegetation. Due to agricultural practices, erosion has greatly increased, so that more and more valuable ground is lost and the intensity of the Swakop floods increases.

Uranium mines such as the Langer Heinrich mine, in the lower reaches of the Swakop, and the Rössing Mine at Khan use enormous quantities of water that further lower the water table. In addition, it is also often claimed that radioactive dust across the Khan gets into the Swakop, and therefore the vegetables cultivated there are contaminated by radioactive materials.

The Swakop Bridge in Swakopmund is a notable man-made sight near the place where the river empties into the ocean.

References

Notes

Literature
 Klaus Hüser, Helga Besler, Wolf Dieter Blümel, Klaus Heine, Hartmut Leser, Uwe Rust: Namibia – Eine Landschaftskunde in Bildern. Klaus Hess, Göttingen/Windhoek 2001, 

Rivers of Namibia
Swakopmund
Geography of Erongo Region
Geography of Khomas Region
Geography of Otjozondjupa Region